This is the discography of one of the most successful and prolific Mexican singers, Lucero, as of 2010, she has released 20 studio albums and two live albums; which has so far sold over 30 million albums worldwide.

Studio albums

Live albums

Special singles, soundtracks, EPs

Compilations
Controversy
Most of the collections are not greater than 5,000 copies sales, and due to this, Lucero had some problems with Universal Music. As a result, the singer Lucero lifted a lawsuit against Universal Music record label for not having received royalties for sales of some of her albums in the last 14 years, when she belonged to Melody Records, now part of that company. She explained that in 1998 the company had agreed to pay what they owed, but until 2008 the debt was never paid off. Lucero said that after an audit that was done ten years ago, it was found that the debt remains and has accumulated over the years, and it was a very large amount.

Collections

Singles

As lead artist

As featured artist

DVDs
This list also includes all the releases where she appears, this covers VHS and DVD versions. The list does not contain the DVDs from telenovelas or films, just music.

Special appearances

Reference list

Discographies of Mexican artists
Latin pop music discographies
Regional Mexican music discographies